Mart Ummelas (20 August 1953 – 13 March 2020) was an Estonian journalist.

He was a member of the Executive Board of Tallinn Television.

References

1953 births
Estonian journalists
People from Tallinn
Estonian radio personalities
Estonian television personalities
Recipients of the Order of the White Star, 5th Class
2020 deaths
Members of the Riigikogu, 1995–1999